Sob o Céu da Bahia is a 1956 Brazilian adventure film directed by Ernesto Remani. It was entered into the 1956 Cannes Film Festival.

Cast
 Sérgio Hingst as Ramiro
 María Morena as Maria
 Pedro Nemi
 Terry Viana
 Enoque Torres
 Carlos Torres
 Francisco Santos

References

External links

1956 adventure films
1956 films
Brazilian black-and-white films
Brazilian adventure films
1950s Portuguese-language films